The following is a list of players, both past and current, who appeared at least in one game for the Kaohsiung Aquas (2021–present) franchise.



Players

A

B

C

H

K

L

S

T

W

Y

References

T1 League all-time rosters